Li Pingping (1960 – June 15, 2004) was a Chinese serial killer who killed and dismembered four women in Beijing between 2002 and 2003, with the help of his wife Dong Meirong. He was convicted of these murders, as well as a 1995 triple murder, sentenced to death and subsequently executed.

Victims 
Li Pingping murdered the following people:

 Song Shutian (宋某), his wife and 12 year old daughter

Biography
Little is known about Li's life. Born in 1960, he was described as an introverted and withdrawn man who rarely communicated with others, seemingly had no friends or hobbies, and immediately went home to sleep after finishing his shift. His first recorded offense was in May 1980, when he was convicted of robbery and given a 1-year period of probation. Five years later, in December 1985, he was again sent to prison for six months for theft.

Sometime between the late 1980s and early 1990s, following his release from prison, Li found a job as a boiler worker for Beijing's Gaotlan Health Food Company, but in 1995, he was fired for poor performance and hostile behavior. Angered by this, he decided to enact revenge on the society he felt had wronged him, and in April of that year, he went to the Fragrant Hills park in Haidian District, where, in the dead of night, he set fire to the house of a Wan Baoming. As a result of this act, nine houses burned down to the ground, amassing more than 57,000 yuan in damages.

Still unsatisfied, Li decided to target his former manager, 40-year-old Song Shutian. About a month after the Fragrant Hills arson, he broke into Shutian's house, killing him, his wife and 12-year-old daughter with a knife. In order to cover up his tracks, he set fire to the house, burning it down to the ground. While fleeing the crime scene, he stole two rings and a tape recorder. When evaluating the damages later on, authorities determined that the cost was around 2,560 renminbi.

Later on, Li found another job as a taxi driver for the Wanquansi Taxi Company, one of Beijing's largest transport companies. Using his newfound profession, between November 2002 and April 2003, he parked in front of karaoke halls, where he picked up prostitutes with whom he would negotiate a price for sexual services in advance. He would then drive his victims to his house, where he stabbed them to death with a fruit knife. In this manner, he managed to kill four prostitutes, extensively mutilating the latter three victims. After he was done, he and his wife, Dong Meirong, would transport the corpses to a nearby garbage dump, where they discard them and leave.

Sentence and execution 
In 2003, Li and his wife were arrested by the authorities. In the investigation that followed, Li, in a calm manner, directed the officers to the garbage dumps, where they dug up the prostitutes' remains. Later on, during an interrogation with detectives, Li claimed that he had wanted to kill the "karaoke ladies" because he was jealous that they made more money than him. Not long after his arrest, he was brought to trial, where he was found guilty of seven murders, arson and theft, receiving the death sentence for his crimes. His wife, for her participation in disposing the corpses, was sentenced to 15 years imprisonment. 

On June 15, 2004, Li Pingping was executed in Beijing's execution grounds with a single gunshot to the head. His execution was covered in a Radio Free Asia interview with a staff member at the Shandong Psychological Counseling Center, where Li had been ordered to undergo an examination before trial. According to the staff member, Li had demonstrated serious mental abnormalities during the test, but these were left undisclosed until after his death.

See also
 List of serial killers by country

References

1960 births
2004 deaths
20th-century Chinese criminals
21st-century Chinese criminals
21st-century executions by China
Chinese murderers of children
Chinese people convicted of murder
Chinese people convicted of robbery
Executed Chinese people
Executed Chinese serial killers
Family murders
Male serial killers
People convicted of arson
People convicted of murder by China
People convicted of theft
People executed by China by firearm
People executed for murder